Dudley Fichite (born 29 June 1978) is a retired Zambian football midfielder.

References

1978 births
Living people
Zambian footballers
Zambia international footballers
Power Dynamos F.C. players
Lusaka Dynamos F.C. players
Green Buffaloes F.C. players
C.D. Primeiro de Agosto players
Association football midfielders
Zambian expatriate footballers
Expatriate footballers in Angola
Zambian expatriate sportspeople in Angola